Do You Be is the sixth album by Meredith Monk, released in January, 1987 through ECM New Series.

Track listing

Personnel 
Musicians
Johanna Arnold – vocals (11)
Robert Een – vocals (6, 8, 9, 11)
John Eppler – vocals (11)
Andrea Goodman – vocals (6-9, 11, 12)
Ching Gonzalez – vocals (8, 9, 11)
Wayne Hankin – vocals (6, 8, 9, 11), keyboards (7), bagpipes (12)
Naaz Hosseini – vocals (6-9, 11, 12), violin (7)
Meredith Monk – vocals, piano (2, 5, 11), synthesizer (1)
Edmund Niemann – piano (4)
Nicky Paraiso – vocals (11)
Nurit Tilles – piano (1, 3, 4), keyboards (7), synthesizer (12), vocals (8, 9)
Production
Manfred Eicher – production
James Farber – recording (3, 4, 11)
JoAnn Verburg – photography
Martin Wieland – recording (1, 2, 5-10, 12), mixing
Barbara Wojirsch – design
Yoshio Yabara – design

References

External links 
 

1987 albums
Albums produced by Manfred Eicher
ECM New Series albums
Meredith Monk albums